Cajidiocan, officially the Municipality of Cajidiocan,  is a 4th class municipality in the province of Romblon, Philippines. According to the 2020 census, it has a population of 23,259 people. The municipality is located on Sibuyan Island, which has been dubbed as the "Galapagos of Asia" due to its pristine natural environment and high endemism rate for flora and fauna.

History

Early history
According to Miguel de Loarca's Relacion de Las Islas Filipinas, the Spaniards led by conquistador Martin de Goiti arrived on Sibuyan Island on 10 May 1570 from Panay. Hence, Cajidiocan, as well as the rest of Romblon, became part of the province of Panay. It was administered as a visita (barrio) of pueblo de Romblon, together with Visita de Azagra.

In 1744, Pueblo de Sibuyan was founded by the Spaniards with Visita de Cajidiocan as its seat. It was one of the early pueblos established and administered as part of Capiz province, the others being Cabolutan, San Agustin (established in 1700), Looc, established in 1844, Romblon and Banton. Beginning in 1779, the friars ordered the construction of stone fortifications in these four pueblos as a defense against attacks from Muslim pirates. One of these forts was built in Bantay de Lubug, Cajidiocan.

On 23 July 1843, the pueblo changed its name to Cajidiocan, derived from the word jidioc, which means "palm", an abundant tree in the area. On 21 November of the same year, the locals were given Spanish surnames starting with the letter "R" as ordered by Spanish governor-general Narciso Claveria. In 1868, when the Spaniards elevated the entire Romblon archipelago into a provinces, Cajidiocan was one of seven pueblos retained.

Modern history
When the Americans arrived in the Philippines and introduced civilian government in Romblon on 16 March 1901, Cajidiocan was one of 11 new municipalities created. However, when Romblon was abolished as a province on 15 July 1907 due to insufficient income, jurisdiction of the municipality was returned to Capiz, which would last until 1917, when Romblon was reinstated as a province.

On 8 June 1940, by virtue of Commonwealth Act No. 581 authored by Congressman Leonardo Festin, the special municipality of Sibuyan was created, with Cajidiocan as its seat and absorbing the neighboring municipalities of Magdiwang and San Fernando. After World War II, on 1 October 1946, this special municipality was abolished by Republic Act No. 38, sponsored by Congressman Modesto Formelleza, and reinstated Cajidiocan, Magdiwang, and San Fernando to its original municipality status.

In 1958, Sibuyan's first government hospital, the Sibuyan District Hospital was established by virtue of Republic Act No. 2400, sponsored by Congressman Jose D. Moreno. On 18 June 1961, through Republic Act No. 3384, Cantagda was created into a separate barrio taken from barrio Danao. Meanwhile, on 17 June 1961 barrio Lumbang was split into two barrios of Lumbang Este and Lumbang Oeste with its old barrio Centro located at Barangay Lumbang Este, while sitios attached to Lumbang Oeste were the following: Pawala, Guinalan, Cansuyat, Agnaga and Hagimit.

In February 2018, the government planned the construction of a road that would go through Mt. Guiting-guiting Natural Park Protected Area, effectively endangering thousands of Sibuyan Island pristine forests that have never been touched by man. An online campaign against the road construction was launched afterwards, urging the President, the Department of Environment and Natural Resources, the Department of Public Work and Highways, the Mt. Guiting-guiting Natural Park Protected Area Management Board, and the LGUs of Sibuyan Island to halt the highly-destructive 'development' project.

Geography
Cajidiocan is located in the north-eastern portion of Sibuyan Island. To its west is the municipality of Magdiwang and to its south is the municipality of San Fernando. To its east lies Sibuyan Sea. It has a total land area of 201.85 km2. 60 percent of which is part of the Mount Guiting-Guiting Natural Park, a mountainous protected wildlife area composed of lush tropical rainforest surrounding the Mount Guiting-Guiting, Sibuyan's tallest mountain. It has narrow strips of flat land along the coast where much of the population is concentrated.

Climate

Barangays
Cajidiocan is politically subdivided into 14 barangays.

Demographics

The locals speak a variant of the Romblomanon language, locally called Sibuyanon (Sibuyanon Cajidiocanon style).

Economy

Because of the abundance of palm trees in its coastal plains and its proximity to the sea, copra farming and fishing are the main sources of livelihood in Cajidiocan. Other livelihood and investment opportunities include agri-business, fish culture and processing, marble mining and processing, cut flower cultivation, cottage industries, garment manufacturing, banking, and tourism.

Government

Pursuant to Chapter II, Title II, Book III of Republic Act 7160 or the Local Government Code of 1991, the municipal government is composed of a mayor (alkalde), a vice mayor (bise alkalde) and members (kagawad) of the legislative branch Sangguniang Bayan alongside a secretary to the said legislature, all of which are elected to a three-year term and are eligible to run for three consecutive terms.

The incumbent mayor and vice mayor of Cajidiocan are Nicasio M. Ramos from the Nacionalista Party and Kenyo "Ken" R. Rabino frpm the PDP–Laban party.

Infrastucture

Utilities
The Romblon Electric Cooperative (ROMELCO) facilitates the power supply in the entire Sibuyan Island, including Cajidiocan. As for water supply, the town has a potable water system, which comes from jet pumps, open wells, artesian wells, and springs. A water irrigation project is also present in the municipality with 188 service areas. Landline and mobile telephone services are also available through PLDT, Smart Communications, and Globe Telecom.

Transportation
Cajidiocan is connected to its neighboring municipalities by the Sibuyan Circumferential Road. Common forms of transportation are light vehicles, including jeepneys, motorcycles, tricycles, and small trucks.

To reach Cajidiocan, visitors can take a RORO ferry from Manila or Batangas City to Ambulong Port in Magdiwang. From there, there are jeepneys that can take visitors to Cajidiocan. Another route is by air via Cebu Pacific which operates four flights weekly from Manila to Tugdan Airport in Alcantara, Romblon. From Alcantara, visitors can travel by jeepney to San Agustin, Romblon, where motorized boats can bring them to Ambulong Port.

Tourism
Cajidiocan has a lot of eco-tourism potential due to its lush natural environment and pristine rivers and falls.

Cawa-cawa Falls: A kettle-shaped pool carved from solid rock by the cascading waters is and teems with native river shrimp. It is located deep within the forest of Lumbang Este.
Alibagon Beach: A small crescent of white sandy beach ideal for swimming and picnic, sail boating, and mountain hiking.
Little Baguio Falls: Take a break from outside pressure and feel the crash of the crystal clear, cool water from the waterfalls, surrounded by boulders and trees which provides shades to visitors. It is about four kilometers from Poblacion.

References

External links

 Cajidiocan Profile - Cities and Municipalities Competitive Index
 [ Philippine Standard Geographic Code]
 Philippine Census Information
 Local Governance Performance Management System

Municipalities of Romblon